Chen Xiaodan (born 5 March 1974) is a Chinese diver. She competed in the women's 10 metre platform event at the 1988 Summer Olympics.

References

External links
 

1974 births
Living people
Chinese female divers
Olympic divers of China
Divers at the 1988 Summer Olympics
Place of birth missing (living people)